The 2002–03 Taça de Portugal was the 63rd edition of the Portuguese football knockout tournament, organized by the Portuguese Football Federation (FPF). The 2002–03 Taça de Portugal began on 8 September 2002. The final was played on 15 June 2003 at the Estádio Nacional.

Sporting CP were the previous holders, having defeated Leixões 1–0 in the previous season's final. Defending champions Sporting CP were eliminated in the fifth round by second division Naval. Porto defeated União de Leiria, 1–0 in the final to win their twelfth Taça de Portugal. As a result of the Dragões winning both the league and cup in the same season, União de Leiria would play in the 2003 Supertaça Cândido de Oliveira against their cup final opponents.

Fourth round
All fourth round cup ties were between the 23 November and the 29 January. The fourth round saw teams from the Primeira Liga (I) enter the competition.

Fifth round
Ties were played between the 17 December and the 26 February. Due to the odd number of teams involved at this stage of the competition, Estrela da Amadora qualified for the sixth round due to having no opponent to face at this stage of the competition.

Sixth round
Ties were played between the 22 January to the 5 March.
Due to the odd number of teams involved at this stage of the competition, Paços de Ferreira qualified for the quarter-finals due to having no opponent to face at this stage of the competition.

Quarter-finals
All quarter-final ties were played on the 8–9 March.

Semi-finals
Ties were played on the 13–14 April.

Final

References

Taça de Portugal seasons
Taca De Portugal, 2002-03
2002–03 domestic association football cups